The Yamani or al-Yamani is a pre-messianic figure in Shia Islamic eschatology, who is prophesied to appear to the people to guide them to the right path prior to the arrival of Imam al-Mahdi, the ultimate savior of mankind from the Shia viewpoint and the final Imam of the Twelve Imams.

Al-Yamani's personality
According to Shia sources, it is not clear whether Al-Yamani is one of descendants of Hasan ibn Ali or Husayn ibn Ali. A tradition by Ja'far al-Sadiq about Yamani ancestry said, "[One] from the lineage of my uncle Zayd will rise from Yemen." There are different names for Al-Yamani in different traditions, such as "Hassan", "Hussein", "Saeed", "Mansour", and "Nasr". Muhammad, prophet of Islam, called him "Nasr" because he will come before Imam al-Mahdi. In some sources, Al-Yamani is mentioned as someone who invites people to the Imam al-Mahdi. Additionally, some sources call Al-Yamani "Mansour" and that he will assist Muhammad al-Mahdi in battle.

Appearance of Yamani
In Shia theology, five signs are guaranteed to occur before Imam al-Mahdi’s appearance. One of them is the appearance of al-Yamani, the ruler of Yemen, who will invite people to right and truth. Ja'far al-Sadiq states the five signs that will occur before Imam al-Mahdi's appearance include: the appearance of Sufyani and Yamani, the loud cry in the sky, the murder of Nafs-e-Zakiyyah, and the earth swallowing a group of people in the land of Beyda. In another Hadith, Muhammad al-Sadiq says that Yamani appears from Yemen with a white flag.

Time and place of the appearance
Yamani will rise up from Yemen. The sixth Imam of Shia says about the place of uprising, "[t]he rise of the Sufyani will be from Syria (Sham) and the rise of the Yemani will be from Yemen.But it's impoertant to niotice that two Yamanies are mentioned in Hadith. One rises from Yemen whom wont support the promised Mahdi,but will fight Sufyani and finally die. And the other one which is not mentioned to be from Yemen, and will support Imam Mahdi.” A Hadith by Muhammad al-Baqir explained, "[t]he appearance of Sufyani, Yamani and Khorasani will take place in one year, one month and one day (at the same time), they will take place as a series of events that are all connected by one string. Among these individuals the Yamani is the closest to guidance, for he calls the people to join Imam al-Mahdi. When he rises the trading of weapons will be prohibited for every Muslim. When he rises join him immediately, for his flag is the flag of guidance and prosperity and no Muslim should oppose it. Any one who does so will go to hell, because the Yamani calls to the right path." In another Hadith, Ali al-Ridha said, "[t]he rise of Sufyani, Yemeni, and Khorasani will be at the same year, month, and day. Trouble will rise from every direction. Woe to those who try to resist them!" Yamani's appearance will occur during the month of Rajab. Some sources suggest that Yamani and Khurasani will be allied against Sufyani.

The conclusion of the appearance 
While traditions provide few details about the conclusion of Yamani's appearance, a hadith by Muhammad al-Sadiq is said, "[a]fter the numerous wars and failures, he will crush on Sufyani and kill him."

See also 

 Khasf al-Bayda' 
 Signs of the reappearance of Muhammad al-Mahdi
 The voice from sky
 Sufyani
 Nafs-e-Zakiyyah (Pure soul)

References

Shia eschatology
Religious leadership roles
Shia imams
Shia Islam
Islamic eschatology
Islamic terminology
Mahdism